Budo or buddo may refer to:
 Budō, a Japanese term describing Japanese martial arts
 Buddo hill, a hill in central Uganda cultural and academic significance
 Kings College Budo, a mixed boarding high school located on Budo Hill
 Budo (G.I. Joe), a fictional character in the G.I. Joe universe
 Budo (musician), an American hip hop producer and multi-instrumentalist
 "Budo", a jazz composition on the Miles Davis Nonet compilation Birth of the Cool